Port Arthur—Thunder Bay was a federal electoral district represented in the House of Commons of Canada from 1925 to 1935. It was located in the province of Ontario. This riding was created in 1924 from parts of Algoma West and Port Arthur and Kenora ridings.

It consisted of the north-east parts of the territorial districts of Kenora and Thunder Bay.

The electoral district was abolished in 1933 when it was merged into Port Arthur riding.

Electoral history

|- 
  
|Conservative
|LANGWORTHY, William Fitzgerald 
|align="right"| 3,277    
 
|Independent Conservative
|CARRICK, John James
|align="right"| 2,424   
  
|Liberal
|MATTHEWS, Isaac Lamont  
|align="right"| 2,413   

|Canadian Labour Party
|SMITH, Albert Edward 
|align="right"| 1,363   
|}

|- 
  
|Conservative
|COWAN, Donald James 
|align="right"|  4,349    
  
|Liberal-Labour
|MCCOMBER, Alexander Jarvis 
|align="right"| 2,990    

|Canadian Labour Party
|SMITH, Albert Edward 
|align="right"| 1,382   
|}

|- 
  
|Conservative
|COWAN, Donald James 
|align="right"| 6,371    
  
|Liberal
|CARRICK, John James 
|align="right"| 4,415   
|}

See also 

 List of Canadian federal electoral districts
 Past Canadian electoral districts

External links 

 Website of the Parliament of Canada

Former federal electoral districts of Ontario
Politics of Thunder Bay